Lincoln Law School of Sacramento is a private, for-profit law school in Sacramento, California. The school offers an evening-only, four-year juris doctor degree program.

Accreditation and bar passage rate 
Lincoln Law School received approval from the Committee of Bar Examiners of the State Bar of California in 1978.

The law school is not accredited by the American Bar Association. Lincoln graduates do not immediately qualify to take the bar exam and join the bar of states other than California  and must following the rules of other admitting jurisdictions in order to sit for their Bar exams, including requisite years in practice or additional education.

Of the 34 Lincoln graduates who took the California bar exam for the first time in October 2020, 20 passed, for a 59% passage rate, vs. a 74% overall pass rate.

Notable alumni 
 Eugene Balonon (Class of 1984), Superior Court of California, Sacramento County
 Bruce Nestande, California state politician
 Leonard Padilla (Class of 1980), television commentator, media personality, and bounty hunter
 Hon. Laurie Earl (Class of 1988), first LGBTQ+ judge on the Third District Court of Appeal <ref="2012 Alumnus of the Year - Lincoln Law School"> </ref> <ref="Newsom taps out judge for appellate bench"> </ref>

References

External links 
 

 
Law schools in California
Universities and colleges in Sacramento County, California
Educational institutions established in 1969
1969 establishments in California
For-profit universities and colleges in the United States